Darwin Brewery is a Sunderland-based brewery which opened in 1994 and expanded in 2002.

Originally a brewing school of the University of Sunderland with an 18-gallon plant,
the demand for the beers that were brewed there spurred an expansion and full commercialisation.

In 1997, Darwin acquired Hodges Brewery in Crook, County Durham, and used the premises as the main brewing plant until the 2002 expansion into their current premises in Hendon, Sunderland.

Beers brewed 

Darwin Bitter (abv 3.6%)
Sunderland Best (abv 3.9%)
Evolution Ale (abv 4.0%)
Durham Light Ale (abv 4.0%)
Richmond Ale (abv 4.5%)
Saint's Sinner (abv 5.0%)
Rolling Hitch (abv 5.2%) ASDA BEER FESTIVAL CHAMPION 2005
Killer Bee (abv 6.0%)
Original Flag Porter (abv 5.0%)
Hop Drop (abv 5.3%) TESCO BEER CHALLENGE WINNER 2005

References

External links
Darwin Brewery official website

University of Sunderland
Companies based in Tyne and Wear
Food and drink companies established in 1994
Breweries in England
British companies established in 1994
1994 establishments in England